Ronald A. Silver (born June 25, 1943) is an American former politician in the state of Florida.

He served in the Florida House of Representatives for the 100th district from 1982 to 1992, as a Democrat. He also served in the Florida State Senate from 1992 to 2002.
On October 15, 2019, in Hicksville, NY, Canbiola, Inc. (OTCQB: CANB), a developer, manufacturer and seller of a variety of hemp-derived THC-Free Cannabidiol (CBD) Isolate products such as oils, drops/tinctures, creams, moisturizers, chews, and capsules announced the appointments of Senator Ron Silver, James Murphy and Alger Boyer Jr. to its board of directors.

References

External links

Living people
1943 births
Democratic Party members of the Florida House of Representatives
People from North Miami Beach, Florida